The second season of the television series Angel, the spin-off of Buffy the Vampire Slayer, premiered on September 26, 2000 on The WB and concluded its 22-episode season on May 22, 2001. It maintained its previous timeslot, airing Tuesdays at 9:00 pm ET, following Buffy.

Cast and characters

Main cast 
 David Boreanaz as Angel
 Charisma Carpenter as Cordelia Chase
 Alexis Denisof as Wesley Wyndam-Pryce
 J. August Richards as Charles Gunn

Recurring cast

Guest cast 
 Eliza Dushku as Faith
 Daniel Dae Kim as Gavin Park
 James Marsters as Spike
 Mercedes McNab as Harmony Kendall
 Mark Metcalf as The Master 
 Alyson Hannigan as Willow Rosenberg

Crew 
Series creators Joss Whedon and David Greenwalt served as executive producers, while Greenwalt would serve as the series' showrunner as Whedon was running Buffy. Whedon didn't write a script for the season, although he did write the stories to "Judgment" and "Happy Anniversary", directed the fourth episode "Untouched" and even acted in the season's penultimate episode as Lorne's dancing cousin Numfar. Buffy writer/producer Marti Noxon served as consulting producer, with other Buffy writers Jane Espenson, Douglas Petrie and David Fury were asked to write freelance scripts.

Tim Minear (supervising producer, promoted to co-executive producer midseason) and Jim Kouf (consulting producer) were the only writers kept on the staff. Minear ended up writing the most episodes of the season, including important episodes during the Angel/Darla story arc including "Darla", "The Trial", "Reunion", "Reprise" and "Epiphany". "Darla" also counted as Minear's directorial debut. Mere Smith, who was a script coordinator during the first season was promoted to a staff writer, and began writing episodes. Shawn Ryan was hired for the season and also served as a producer.

James A. Contner (also co-producer) directed the highest number of episodes in the second season, directing three episodes. David Greenwalt directed two, including the season finale.

Episodes

Reception 
The second season won the International Horror Guild Award for Best Television. It was nominated for five Saturn Awards – Best Network Television Series, Best Actor on Television (David Boreanaz), Best Actress on Television (Charisma Carpenter), Best Supporting Actor on Television (Alexis Denisof) and Best Supporting Actress on Television (Juliet Landau).

The Futon Critic named "Reunion" the 20th best episode of 2000. Slayage cited the episode "Are You Now or Have You Ever Been" as the greatest episode of the series.

The second season averaged 4.1 million viewers, slightly lower than the fifth season of Buffy.

DVD release 
Angel: The Complete Second Season was released on DVD in region 1 on September 2, 2003 and in region 2 on April 15, 2002. The DVD includes all 22 episodes on 6 discs presented in anamorphic widescreen 1.78:1 aspect ratio. Special features on the DVD include two commentary tracks—"Are You Now or Have You Ever Been" by writer Tim Minear and "Over the Rainbow" by director Fred Keller. Scripts for "Darla" and "Disharmony" are included. Featurettes include, "Making up the Monsters", which details the make-up design; "Inside the Agency" is a set tour of various sets; "Stunts" details the choreography of the stunts; and "Season 2 Overview" is a summary of the season featuring interviews with cast and crew members. A photo stills gallery is also included.

References

External links 
 

Angel (1999 TV series)
 
2000 American television seasons
2001 American television seasons